Cicero is an extinct town in Defiance County, in the U.S. state of Ohio.

History
Cicero had its start in 1846 when a sawmill was built there. Once the surrounding forests were depleted, the sawmill closed and the town's population dwindled. Cicero had a post office from 1852 until it was discontinued in 1901.

References

Geography of Defiance County, Ohio